Michigan's 99th House of Representatives district (also referred to as Michigan's 99th House district) is a legislative district within the Michigan House of Representatives located in parts of Bay, Clare, and Gladwin counties, as well as all of Arenac, Iosco, and Ogemaw counties. The district was created in 1965, when the Michigan House of Representatives district naming scheme changed from a county-based system to a numerical one. The district lines were redrawn to now consist of Iosco, Ogemaw and Arenac counties in their entirety and portions of Bay, Clare and Gladwin counties.

List of representatives

Recent Elections

Historical district boundaries

References 

Michigan House of Representatives districts
Isabella County, Michigan
Midland County, Michigan